The Achievement with Integrity Movement (AIM) is a South Cotabato regional political party in the Philippines, closely affiliated with the Nationalist People's Coalition and the Genuine Opposition.

The party was founded by former General Santos mayor and South Cotabato Representative Adelbert Antonino.

There are no results available of the last elections for the House of Representatives, but according to the website of the House, the party holds 1 out of 237 seats (state of the parties, June 2007).

References

Local political parties in the Philippines
Politics of South Cotabato
Regionalist parties